Fritz Hakl (1 January 1932 – 28 February 2012) was an Austrian actor with the honorary title Kammerschauspieler.

Biography 
Born in Oberfeistritz, Steiermark to ordinary-size parents, Fritzs Hakl was the small-sized sixth child in a poor family. From 1966 to 1994 he was part of the ensemble of the Vienna Burgtheater. In 1978 he played the clown and vaudeville group director Bebra in Volker Schlöndorff's film adaptation of the novel The Tin Drum by Günter Grass.

Since his retirement from the stage in 1994, Fritz Hakl lived again in his native Oberfeistritz. He died in Graz in 2012.

Filmography

Honors 

 1986: Goldenes Ehrenzeichen der Republik Österreich
 1989: Title Kammerschauspieler

External links 

 
 Biography

References 

1932 births
2012 deaths
Austrian male stage actors
Austrian male film actors
Actors with dwarfism
Recipients of the Decoration for Services to the Republic of Austria
People from Weiz District